City of Bad Men is a 1953 American Western film directed by Harmon Jones and starring Jeanne Crain and Dale Robertson.

Plot
A heavyweight championship fight between "Gentleman Jim" Corbett and Bob Fitzsimmons is coming to Carson City, Nevada at exactly the same time outlaw Brett Stanton and brother Gar return to town. Away for six years in Mexico, Brett has alienated his former love, Linda Culligan, who is now involved with Jim London, the fight's promoter. London's sister, Cynthia Castle, tries to attract Brett's interest, but he only has eyes for Linda.

Because the bout could sell as much as $100,000 in tickets, law-breakers like Johnny Ringo are also milling around, keeping Sheriff Bill Gifford on his toes. He plays a strategy where he asks Ringo, another outlaw, and Brett, to be deputies just for the week of the fight. Gifford's idea is that this will offer incentive to the men to keep their respective gangs in order and keep the peace in town, so everyone might enjoy the festivities. The three agree to do this but soon Brett is the only one still on board. He is actually scheming to steal the fight's proceeds. .

A match-day decision by Linda to end her engagement to Jim changes Brett's plans; he decides to go straight. However, his brother Gar betrays him to Ringo, who goes through with the daring robbery. Brett has to exchange gunfire with Ringo and face down Gar - whom Ringo has mortally wounded. When it is all over, Linda and Brett are finally reconciled.

Cast
 Jeanne Crain as Linda Culligan
 Dale Robertson as Brett Stanton
 Richard Boone as Johnny Ringo
 Lloyd Bridges as Gar Stanton
 Carole Mathews as Cynthia Castle
 Carl Betz as Deputy Phil Ryan
 Whitfield Connor as Jim London
 Hugh Sanders as  Sheriff Bill Gifford
 Rodolfo Acosta as Mendoza
 Pascual García Peña as Pig

Home media
City of Bad Men was released in 2014 as a "publish on demand" DVD in the United States.

In popular culture
In episode five of the first season of the USA network series Graceland, the main character Mike (who is an undercover FBI agent) has a conversation with one of his targets, the ruthless Nigerian crime lord "Bello" (played by actor Gbenga Akinnagbe), where at one point the film is mentioned after Mike quotes a line from the film. Bello admits he's impressed with his knowledge of the film and admits he's a fan. Bello even shows Mike a copy of the film on DVD in a video store later on in the episode.

Historical errors about fight
The actual Corbett-Fitzsimmons fight took place in an outdoor venue, the Racetrack Arena in Carson City.  The movie has the fight being held in an indoor arena under artificial lights.
In the movie, Bob Fitzsimmons is shown competing in tights that ran down the length of his legs.  In reality, Fitzsimmons wore short trunks.

References

Further reading
 A rare, recent review of the film by a blogger who's working on a book about 1950s western films.

External links

 
 
 

1953 films
20th Century Fox films
1953 Western (genre) films
Films directed by Harmon Jones
American Western (genre) films
Films set in Nevada
Films set in 1897
Cultural depictions of Johnny Ringo
1950s English-language films
1950s American films